The Heart's Desire Formation is a formation of 'olive-green' sandstones cropping out in Newfoundland.

References

Ediacaran Newfoundland and Labrador